The Ministry of Aviation was a department of the United Kingdom government established in 1959.  Its responsibilities included the regulation of civil aviation and the supply of military aircraft, which it took on from the Ministry of Supply.

In 1967, the Ministry of Aviation merged into the Ministry of Technology which took on the supply of military aircraft, while regulatory responsibilities were switched to the Board of Trade.

Ministers of Aviation
 14 October 1959: Duncan Sandys
 27 July 1960: Peter Thorneycroft
 16 July 1962: Julian Amery
 18 October 1964: Roy Jenkins
 23 December 1965: Frederick Mulley
 7 January 1967 – 15 February 1967: John Stonehouse

Parliamentary Secretaries
 22 October 1959: Geoffrey Rippon
 9 October 1961: Christopher Woodhouse
 16 July 1962: Basil de Ferranti
 3 December 1962: Neil Marten
 20 October 1964: John Stonehouse
 6 April 1966 – 7 January 1967: Julian Snow

Permanent Secretaries
 1959: Sir William Strath
 1960: Henry Hardman (knighted in 1962)
 1963: Sir Richard Way
 1966: Sir Richard Clarke
 1966–7: Sir Ronald Melville

References

1959 establishments in the United Kingdom
Aviation
Aviation history of the United Kingdom
United Kingdom, Aviation
1967 disestablishments in the United Kingdom